Zhao Dun or Zhaodun may refer to:

People
Zhao Dun (Spring and Autumn) ( 7th century BC), a minister of the State of Jin during the Spring and Autumn period
Emperor Guangzong of Song (1147–1200), emperor of the Song dynasty

Places in China
Zhaodun Township, in Zhuanglang County, Gansu
Zhaodun, Jiangsu, a town in Pizhou, Jiangsu